FASTag is an electronic toll collection system in India, operated by the National Highways Authority of India (NHAI). It employs Radio Frequency Identification (RFID) technology for making toll payments directly from the prepaid or savings account linked to it or directly toll owner. It is affixed on the windscreen of the vehicle and enables to drive through toll plazas without stopping for transactions. The tag can be purchased from official Tag issuers or participating Banks and if it is linked to a prepaid account, then recharging or top-up can be as per requirement. As per NHAI, FASTag has unlimited validity. 7.5% cashback offers were also provided to promote the use of FASTag. Dedicated Lanes at some Toll plazas have been built for FASTag.

In January 2019, state-run oil marketing companies IOC, BPCL and HPCL have signed MoUs enabling the use of FASTag to make purchases at petrol pumps.

As of September 2019, FASTag lanes are available on over 500 national and state highways and over 54.6 lakh (5.46 million) cars are enabled with FASTag. Starting 1 January 2021, FASTag was to be mandatory for all vehicles but later the date was postponed to 15 February 2021.

Timeline 

 The system was initially set up as a pilot project in 2014 on the stretch of the Golden Quadrilateral between Ahmedabad and Mumbai. 
 The system was implemented on the Delhi - Mumbai arm of the Quadrilateral on 4 November 2014.
 In July 2015, toll plazas on the Chennai - Bangalore stretch of the Golden Quadrilateral started accepting FASTag payments.
 By April 2016, FASTag was rolled out to 247 toll plazas on national highways across India, representing 70% of all toll plazas in the country at the time.
 By 23 November 2016, 347 fee plazas out of 366 on national highways across the country accept FASTag payments.
 On 1 October 2017, the NHAI launched a FASTag lane in all 370 toll plazas under its ambit.
 On 8 November 2017, it was followed up by making FASTag mandatory on all new vehicles sold in India after December 2017.
 On 19 October 2019, it was announced that FASTag will be mandatory on all National Highways from 1 December 2019 and non-FASTag users will be charged double the toll.
During November, GMR Hyderabad International Airport launches FASTag Car Park facility.
 On 15 December 2019, FASTag became mandatory throughout India.
 600+ Toll Plazas are now connected with FASTag. Many more are in queue to connect very soon.
 On 1 January 2021, FASTag was made mandatory at every toll plaza in the country. but later the date was postponed to 15 February 2021.

References

External links 
 Webpage for FASTag on NHAI website

Electronic toll collection
E-government in India
Toll roads in India
Ministry of Road Transport and Highways
Indian trucking industry
Modi administration initiatives
Fare collection systems
2014 establishments in India